Trichocladium is a genus of fungi within the Chaetomiaceae family.

Species

Trichocladium achrasporum
Trichocladium alopallonellum
Trichocladium alpinum
Trichocladium angelicum
Trichocladium asperum
Trichocladium brosimi
Trichocladium canadense
Trichocladium charticola
Trichocladium constrictum
Trichocladium diversicoloratum
Trichocladium elegans
Trichocladium englandense
Trichocladium fuscum
Trichocladium heterospora
Trichocladium indicum
Trichocladium ismailiense
Trichocladium lignicola
Trichocladium lobatum
Trichocladium macrosporum
Trichocladium medullare
Trichocladium melhae
Trichocladium moenitum
Trichocladium nipponicum
Trichocladium novae-zelandiae
Trichocladium nypae
Trichocladium olivaceum
Trichocladium opacum
Trichocladium palmae
Trichocladium pavgii
Trichocladium pyriforme
Trichocladium sigmoidea
Trichocladium singaporense
Trichocladium taiwanense
Trichocladium tenellum
Trichocladium ucrainicum
Trichocladium uniseptatum
Trichocladium variosporum

References

External links

Sordariales